Bence Bárdos (born 2 May 1998) is a Hungarian professional footballer who plays for Diósgyőr.

Club statistics

Updated to games played as of 16 March 2019.

References

1998 births
Living people
People from Ózd
Hungarian footballers
Association football defenders
Diósgyőri VTK players
Szolnoki MÁV FC footballers
Nemzeti Bajnokság I players
Nemzeti Bajnokság II players
Sportspeople from Borsod-Abaúj-Zemplén County